Kwamé Holland (born 28 March 1973) is an American rapper and record producer from Queens, New York. Starting as a rapper in the late 1980s, he later saw success as a producer.

Biography
In 1989, aged 16, Kwamé released his debut album, Kwamé the Boy Genius: Featuring a New Beginning, which he produced with Hurby "Luv Bug" Azor. The title refers to his backing band, which was unusual for emcees at the time. The music videos featured a polka-dot motif in the costumes and production design. This became Kwamé's trademark and a hip hop fashion fad, as his fans began wearing it. 
In 1990, Kwamé released his second album A Day in the Life: a Pokadelick Adventure, a concept album about a day in the life of a high school student. The album spawned singles "Oneovdabigboiz" and "Ownlee Eue.", the latter of which was part of the new jack swing genre.

In 1992, aged 18, he released his third album, Nastee. This album was a departure for him, discarding the polka-dots and writing more sexually charged lyrics, in contrast to his previously playful, intellectual persona. The title track was a minor hit, but the album quickly fell from the chart. His fourth album, 1994's Incognito, failed to chart.

In 2000, Kwamé reemerged as a record producer, sometimes working under the name K-1 Million. He produced for artists such as LL Cool J, Mary J. Blige, Keyshia Cole, Missy Elliott, and Christina Aguilera. In 2004, he co-produced (with Eminem) Lloyd Banks' hit song "On Fire." In 2005, he co-wrote and co-produced Tweet's single "Turn da Lights Off and Will Smith's single "Switch". As a producer, Kwamé has sold over 30 million records.

In 2012, Kwamé teamed up with Vin Diesel to help score his web series The Ropes. He also formed the boutique label Make Noise, and released an instrumental album, Break Beat Diaries.

Kwamé has also written scores and music for film and TV, including Drumline, Step Up 1 & 2, Freedom Writers, Coach Carter, and Fantastic Four and recently produced Vivian Green's fifth album Vivid. He has joined the hip hop group the Alumni, alongside Chubb Rock, Dana Dane, Special Ed, and Monie Love.

In 2015, Kwamé formed Make Noise Recordings. Distributed by Caroline / Capitol records, Kwamé signed R&B singer Vivian Green and released her fifth album, Vivid. Also garnered a top 2 R&B hit "Get Right Back To My Baby" & top 15 R&B Hit "Grown Folks Music (Work)" .

In 2016, TV One aired an episode of Unsung featuring Kwamé, in which he scored all the music for his episode.

In 2017, Make Noise released Vivian Green's sixth album VGVI reaching No. 38 on the Billboard R&B albums chart. The single "I Don't Know" reached the top 10 on the Billboard adult R&B chart. In 2018, Make Noise released "Vibes", the second single from VGVI. This reached No. 12 on the Adult R&B chart.

Personal life
Kwamé is a cousin of Vin Diesel, who danced in some of his early music videos.

Discography (as artist)

Albums
Kwamé the Boy Genius: Featuring a New Beginning (1989)
A Day in the Life: A Pokadelick Adventure (1990)
Nastee (1992)
Incognito (1994, Ichiban Records)
Break Beat Diaries (Instrumental Album) (2012, MAKE NOISE Recordings)

Singles

References

External links

African-American male rappers
American hip hop record producers
Atlantic Records artists
Cold Chillin' Records artists
Five percenters
Living people
People from Queens, New York
Rappers from New York City
1973 births
21st-century American rappers
Record producers from New York (state)
21st-century American male musicians
21st-century African-American musicians
20th-century African-American people